Viktor Rudoy (born 11 February 1962) is a retired Soviet and Ukrainian football player. He spend most of his career to Desna Chernihiv the main club in Chernihiv.

Career
A pupil of the Chernigov Children's and Youth Sports School of Desna Chernihiv, coaches - Miroslav Mandrik, Efim Shkolnikov. Since 1980 he played at the senior level for the Desna Chernihiv in the second league of the USSR. In 1982 he became the second prize-winner of the Ukrainian SSR championship among the teams of the second league. In 1984 he moved to Metalurh Zaporizhya, who played in the first league, but played only 12 matches, in all of them he came out on substitutions. In 1985 he moved to Nyva Vinnytsia, spent four and a half seasons with it, having played 175 matches in the second league. In the summer of 1989 he temporarily returned to Desna Chernihiv, which played in the second and then in the second lower league. In the last season of the USSR championship, he played in the second lower league for Neftyanik (Akhtyrka) and in the first league for Bukovyna Chernivtsi, but he could not gain a foothold anywhere. After the collapse of the USSR, he played for some time in amateur competitions in Chernigov. In the summer of 1993, he moved to Nyva Vinnytsia and played 2 matches in the Ukrainian Premier League. He played his debut match in the tournament on August 8, 1993 against Torpedo Zaporizhia, replacing Viktor Budnik in the 76th minute. At the beginning of 1994 he returned to Desna Chernihiv, which played in the first league and finished there last in IN 1999 and also played few games with Domostroitel Chernihiv.

Honours
Desna Chernihiv
Ukrainian Second League: 1996–97

Torpedo Mogilev
Belarusian Cup: Runners-up 1994–95

Desna Chernihiv
Championship of the Ukrainian SSR: Runner-up 1982

References

External links 
Profile on website 

1962 births
Living people
Footballers from Zhytomyr
Soviet footballers
Ukrainian footballers
SDYuShOR Desna players
FC Desna-3 Chernihiv players
FC Desna Chernihiv players
FC Metalurh Zaporizhzhia players
FC Nyva Vinnytsia players
FC Naftovyk-Ukrnafta Okhtyrka players
FC Bukovyna Chernivtsi players
FC Cheksyl Chernihiv players
FC Torpedo Mogilev players
Hapoel Ashkelon F.C. players
FC Ros Bila Tserkva players
Ukrainian expatriate footballers
Expatriate footballers in Belarus
Expatriate footballers in Israel
Association football midfielders